The 2011 Delray Beach International Tennis Championships was a professional tennis tournament played on hard courts. It was the 19th edition of the tournament which was part of the World Tour 250 series of the 2011 ATP World Tour. It took place in Delray Beach, United States between 21 and 27 February 2011. Unseeded Juan Martín del Potro, who entered on a Special Exempt, won the singles title.

ATP entrants

Seeds

 Rankings are as of February 14, 2011.

Other entrants
The following players received wildcards into the singles main draw:
  James Blake
  Ryan Harrison
  Sam Querrey

The following entrant has been granted a Special Exemption into the main draw:
  Juan Martín del Potro

The following players received entry from the qualifying draw:

  Alejandro Falla
  Blaž Kavčič
  Marinko Matosevic
  Ryan Sweeting

The following players received entry as a lucky loser into the singles main draw:
  Robert Farah
  Jan Hájek
  Igor Kunitsyn
  Donald Young

Finals

Singles

 Juan Martín del Potro defeated  Janko Tipsarević, 6–4, 6–4
It was del Potro's 1st title of the year and 8th of his career.

Doubles

 Scott Lipsky /  Rajeev Ram defeated  Christopher Kas /  Alexander Peya, 4–6, 6–4, [10–3]

External links
Official website
ATP official site

Delray Beach International Tennis Championships
Delray Beach Open
Delray Beach International Tennis Championships
Delray Beach International Tennis Championships
Delray Beach International Tennis Championships